The diplomatic missions in Taiwan include embassies; trade and cultural missions include representative offices. Due to the special political status and One-China policy, Taiwan is only recognized by thirteen countries, all of whom have an embassies in Taipei. In addition, approximately 60 countries, which do not have diplomatic relations with the Republic of China, have established trade offices and other unofficial offices in Taiwan, which have a wide array of titles. However, due to opposition from  People's Republic of China, the unofficial representative offices' titles do not have the word "Taiwan", except for unofficial representative offices from Papua New Guinea, Somaliland, Oman, Japan, and the United States. During the Japanese colonial period, a number of countries including the Republic of China and the United States of America maintained consulates in Taipei.

Embassies

Representative and Trade and Branch Offices 
 Taipei
 (Argentina Trade and Cultural Office)
 (Australian Office Taipei)
 (Austrian Office Taipei) and (Austrian Commercial Office)
 (Belgian Office, Taipei)
 (Commercial Office of Brazil to Taipei)
 (Brunei Darussalam Trade and Tourism Office)
 (Canadian Trade Office in Taipei)
 (Chilean Trade Office)
 (Czech Economic and Cultural Office)
 (Trade Council of Denmark, Taipei)
 (European Economic and Trade Office)
 (Finland Trade Center)
 (French Office in Taipei)
 (German Institute Taipei) and (German Trade Office Taipei)
 (Hungarian Trade Office, Taipei)
 (India-Taipei Association)
 (Indonesian Economic and Trade Office to Taipei)
 (Israel Economic and Cultural Office in Taipei)
 (Italian Economic, Trade and Cultural Promotion Office)
 (Japan–Taiwan Exchange Association, Taipei Office)
 (The Jordanian Commercial Office)
 (Lithuanian Trade Representative Office)
 (Luxembourg Trade and Investment Office, Taipei)
 (Malaysian Friendship and Trade Centre, Taipei)
 (Mexican Trade Services Documentation and Cultural Office)
 (Ulaanbaatar Trade and Economic Representative Office)
 (Netherlands Office Taipei)
 (New Zealand Commerce and Industry Office)
 (Commercial Office of the Sultanate of Oman-Taiwan)
 (Papua New Guinea Trade Office in Taiwan)
 (Commercial Office of Peru in Taipei)
 (Manila Economic and Cultural Office)
 (Polish Office in Taipei)
 (Representative Office in Taipei for the Moscow-Taipei Coordination Commission on Economic and Cultural Cooperation)
 (Saudi Arabian Trade Office in Taipei)
 (Singapore Trade Office in Taipei)
 (Slovak Economic and Cultural Office, Taipei)
 (Republic of Somaliland Representative Office in Taiwan)
 (Liaison Office of the Republic of South Africa)
 (Korean Mission in Taipei)
 (Spanish Chamber of Commerce)
 (Swedish Trade and Invest Council)
 (Trade Office of Swiss Industries)
 (Thailand Trade and Economic Office)
 (Turkish Trade Office in Taipei)
 (British Office Taipei)
 (American Institute in Taiwan, Taipei Office)
 (Vietnam Economic and Cultural Office in Taipei)

 New Taipei
  (Nigeria Trade Office)
 Taipei
 (Honorary Trade Office)
 (Office of Representative A.H. Hellenic Organization for the Promotion of Exports)

 Kaohsiung
  (Honorary Trade Office)
  (Japan-Taiwan Exchange Association, Kaohsiung Office)
  (Honorary Trade Office)
  (Manila Economic and Cultural Office, Kaohsiung Office)
  (American Institute in Taiwan, Kaohsiung Branch Office)

 Taichung
  (Manila Economic and Cultural Office, Taichung Office)

Gallery

Honorary Consulates
 Kaohsiung
  
  
 
 Taichung

Former missions/embassies
Taipei

 (Colombian Trade Office)

 (S.A.R. of PRC) (Hong Kong Economic, Trade and Cultural Office)

 (S.A.R. of PRC) (Macau Economic and Cultural Office)

 (Myanmar Trade Office)

 (Norwegian Trade Council)

See also 
Foreign relations of Taiwan
List of diplomatic missions of Taiwan
Ministry of Foreign Affairs (Republic of China)

References

External link 

 
Diplomatic missions
Taiwan

Diplomatic missions